John William Wright (born January 11, 1946) is a former American football wide receiver. He played for the Atlanta Falcons in 1968 and for the Detroit Lions in 1969.

References

1946 births
Living people
American football wide receivers
Illinois Fighting Illini football players
Atlanta Falcons players
Detroit Lions players